Reptilisocia is a genus of moths belonging to the family Tortricidae.

Species
Reptilisocia gunungana Razowski, 2013
Reptilisocia impetigo Razowski, 2012
Reptilisocia paraxena Diakonoff, 1983
Reptilisocia paryphaea (Meyrick, 1907)
Reptilisocia solomonensis Razowski, 2012
Reptilisocia tarica Razowski, 2012

See also
List of Tortricidae genera

References

 , 2005: World Catalogue of Insects vol. 5 Tortricidae.
 , 2012: Descriptions of new Tortricini from the Oriental and Australian regions (Lepidoptera: Tortricidae). SHILAP Revista de Lepidopterología 40 (159): 315–335. Full article: .

External links
Tortricid.net

Tortricini
Tortricidae genera